Tom Lewis may refer to:

Tom Lewis (Australian politician) (1922–2016), New South Wales politician
Tom Lewis (chef), Scottish chef
Tom Lewis (author) (born 1958), Australian author and military historian
Tom Lewis (physician) (1918–2004), British obstetrician
Tom Lewis (American politician) (1924–2003), U.S. Representative from Florida, 1993–1995
Tom Lewis (rugby union) (1902–1994), Welsh rugby international
Tom Lewis (songwriter) (born 1943), British folksinger/songwriter
Tom E. Lewis (1958–2018), actor and musician
Tom Lewis (golfer) (born 1991), English golfer
Tom Lewis (cricketer) (born 1991), English cricketer
Tom Lewis (actor), British actor
Tom Lewis (1867−1927), American actor

See also
Thomas Lewis (disambiguation)
Tommy Lewis (disambiguation)